Euarestoides is a genus of the family Tephritidae. The genus contains six species.

Species
Euarestoides abstersus (Loew, 1862) - Bahamas, eastern Canada and USA
Euarestoides acutangulus (Thomson, 1869) - Canada, Chile, Colombia, Cuba, Dominican Republic, Ecuador, Mexico, Peru, Puerto Rico, Trinidad & Tobago, USA, and Venezuela
Euarestoides bimaculatus Savaris & Norrbom, 2019 - Peru
Euarestoides dreisbachi Foote, 1958 - Guatemala, Mexico, Peru
Euarestoides pereirai Savaris & Norrbom, 2019  - Brazil
Euarestoides rionegrensis Savaris & Norrbom, 2019  - Colombia

References

Tephritinae
Tephritidae genera
Diptera of North America
Diptera of South America